Blood is a surname. Notable people with the surname include:

 Aretas Blood (1816–1897), American railroad innovator
 Archer Blood (1923–2004), American diplomat
 Benjamin Paul Blood (1832–1919), American philosopher and poet
 Ben Blood (1989), American professional ice hockey player
 C. L. Blood (fl. 1867–1890), American physician
 Bindon Blood (1842–1940), British military commander 
 Ernest Blood (1872–1955), American basketball coach
 Gertrude Elizabeth Blood (1857–1911), Irish-born author, playwright, columnist, editor and socialite
 Henry H. Blood (1872–1942), American businessman and two-term governor of Utah
 Holcroft Blood (c.1657-1707), Anglo-Irish soldier
 Maurice Blood (1870–1940), British sport shooter 
 Nick Blood (b. 1982), English actor, director and producer
 Richard Henry Blood (b. 1953), American professional wrestler better known as Ricky "The Dragon" Steamboat
 Richard Henry Blood Jr. (b. 1987), American professional wrestler better known as Ricky Steamboat Jr.
 Robert O. Blood (1887–1975), American physician and politician and two-term governor of New Hampshire
 Rogers Blood (1922–1944), United States Marine Corps officer and posthumous Silver Star recipient
 Thomas Blood (1618–1680), Irish colonel who tried to steal the Crown Jewels of England